Cassin's finch (Haemorhous cassinii) is a bird in the finch family, Fringillidae. This species and the other "American rosefinches" are placed in the genus Haemorhous.

Description 
Measurements:

 Length: 6.3 in (16 cm)
 Weight: 0.8-1.2 oz (24-34 g)
 Wingspan: 9.8-10.6 in (25-27 cm)

Adults have a short forked brown tail and brown wings. They have a longer bill than the purple finch. Adult males are raspberry red on the head, breast, back and rump; their back and undertail are streaked. Adult females have light brown upperparts and light underparts with brown streaks throughout; their facial markings are less distinct than those of the female purple finch.

Their breeding habitat is coniferous forest in mountains of western North America as far south as northern New Mexico and Arizona; also Southern California near Baja California. They nest in large conifers. They move to lower elevations in winter.

Northernmost breeding birds migrate south, as do some birds throughout the range of the species; many birds are permanent residents, however. Some non-breeding birds winter as far south as central interior Mexico.

These birds forage in trees, sometimes in ground vegetation. They mainly eat seeds, buds and berries, some insects. When not nesting, they often feed in small flocks.

This bird was named after John Cassin, who was a curator at the Philadelphia Academy of Natural Sciences.

Taxonomy
Cassin's finch, along with the purple finch and house finch, was formerly placed in the genus Carpodacus, along with the rosefinches of Eurasia. However, the three North American species are not closely related to the Old World rosefinch radiation, and thus have been moved to the genus Haemorhous by most taxonomic authorities.

References

External links

 Cassin's Finch Identification Cornell Lab of Ornithology  ("Haemorhous cassinii") – Cornell Lab of Ornithology

Cassin's finch
Cassin's finch
Native birds of Western Canada
Native birds of the Western United States
Native birds of the Rocky Mountains
Cassin's finch
Cassin's finch